Kunwar Singh Tekam is the Bharatiya Janata Party Member of the Madhya Pradesh Legislative Assembly for Dhauhani constituency in Sidhi district. He gained 60704 (54.58%) votes in the 2008 election. He gained 60130 votes (Won by 19001 votes) in the 2013 election and was reelected in the 2018 election.

Biography

His birth name is Shri Kunwar Singh Tekam. He was born on 10 March 1963, he was born in Vill-Chhuhiya Dhupkhad, Tahsil Kusmi, District Sidhi M.P. and his father is the late Dheer Shah Singh. He has educational qualifications, Post Graduate in Sociology and professional qualifications in computer expertise.

Social Service Experience

 Associated with various problems of poor tribals like de-addiction, exploitation woman free, drinking water, land and forest problem and constitutional provision for the welfare of STs. etc.
 To ensure opening of school in ST populated areas after making proper survey by the Govt.
 To ensure proper education in ST populated area.
 Associated with ‘Swaprerna Shikchya Abhiyan’ for providing primary education to tribal boys and girls since last 10 years.
 To organize seminar to bring awareness among tribals in social and economical field.
 To provide assistance to the poor tribals for getting loans from the Agricultural Co-operative Banks etc.
 Associated with organizing of de-addiction program in tribal areas
 Associated with organizing of health camps in tribal areas
 Associated with organizing various seminars in tribal areas to bring awareness about the legal constitutional provision for the Scheduled Tribes.

Political Experience

1983 Working Member, Bharatiya Koyala Khadan Sramik Sangh
CWS Jayant Singrauli (Affiliated to BMS), associated with the unsettled ST Workers of NCL and NTPC
for their resettlement and rehabilitation.

1984 -1991 Office Bearer of Bharatiya Koyala Khadan Sramik Sangh

1992 President of Bharatiya Koyala Khadan Sramik Sangh CWS Jayant Singrauli

1999 Member, Managing Committee of Vidya Bharati: Saraswati, Siksha Parished Saraswati Shishumandir Jayant, Dhudhi Chua, and Jaitpur District Sidh

2000 Member, Telecom Advisory Committee, Government of India, District Sidhi, (M.P.)

2000 District President Sidhi District Adivasi Vikas Parished 
Member, Ministry of Rural Development Government of India for Sidhi District.

2000 Lifetime Member of Akhil Bharatiya Adivasi Vikas Parished (Regd.)

2000 National Council Member of Bhartiya Janta Party

2002 Member of Rural Development of Advisory Committee Government of India (District Sidhi)

2004-07 Chairman (Cabinet Minister Status), National Commission for Scheduled Tribes Government of India New Delhi

2007 BJP Candidate of (Sidhi Constituency) LokSabha By-Election

2007-10 Vice President BJP ST Morcha (M.P.)

2008-13 Member of the Madhya Pradesh Legislative Assembly

2009 Member of Railway Consumers Advisory Committee Dhanbad

2009-13 President of Tribal Development Project Sidhi (M.P.)

2009-13 Member of Tribal Advisory Committee Madhya Pradesh

2010-11 Member of ST, SC And OBC Welfare Committee Madhya Pradesh Vidhan Sabha

2010-13 Pradesh Mahamantri of Bharatiya Janata Party

2011-12 Member of Estimate Committee Madhya Pradesh Vidhan Sabha

2011-12 Member of Consultant Committee Ministry of Labour Madhya Pradesh

2012-13 Member of Consultant Committee Ministry of Law and Legislative Affairs Madhya Pradesh

2012-13 Member of ST, SC and OBC Welfare Committee Madhya Pradesh Vidhan Sabha

2013 Member of BJP Working Committee Madhya Pradesh

2013 Member of the Madhya Pradesh Legislative Assembly (Again Elected)

2018 Member of the Madhya Pradesh Legislative Assembly (Again Elected)

References

Bharatiya Janata Party politicians from Madhya Pradesh
Living people
People from Sidhi district
Madhya Pradesh MLAs 2008–2013
Year of birth missing (living people)
Madhya Pradesh MLAs 2018–2023